Andrée Lumière (22 June 1894 – 26 November 1918) was a French actress, best known for appearing in Repas de bébé (1895).

Early life and career 
Andrée Lumière was born on 22 June 1894 in Lyon, France, as the only daughter of Auguste Lumière and Mrs. Auguste Lumière. In 1895, at the age of 1, Andrée appeared in the silent short film Repas de bébé. She is the possible actress in the 1896 silent short film Childish Quarrel.

Death 
On 26 November 1918 in Lyon, France, Andrée Lumière died due to the Spanish influenza.

Filmography 

 Repas de bébé, as herself.
 La Pêche aux poissons rouges, as herself.
 Retour d'une promenade en mer, as herself.
 Enfants aux jouets, as herself.
 Ronde enfantine, as herself.

In media 
Andrée Lumière is seen in the 2016 documentary Lumière!.

References 

1894 births
1918 deaths
20th-century French actresses
French film actresses
Deaths from the Spanish flu pandemic in France
Actresses from Lyon